"Fifteen Years Ago" is a song written by Raymond Smith, and recorded by American country music artist Conway Twitty.  It was released in September 1970 as the first single and title track from the album Fifteen Years Ago.  The song was Twitty's fifth number one on the U.S. country singles chart.  The single stayed at number one for a single week and spent a total of 16 weeks on the chart.

Content
The song is about a man who still thinks about a former girlfriend, with whom he had broken up 15 years earlier after a deep, emotional relationship. His memories of the past are triggered when he runs into an old friend who mentions the ex-girlfriend's name, and despite his best efforts to make his wife happy he is troubled by his persisting thoughts of the past relationship.

Personnel
Conway Twitty — vocals
Joe E. Lewis, The Jordanaires — background vocals
Harold Bradley — electric 6-string bass guitar
Grady Martin — electric guitar
Larry Butler — piano
Ray Edenton — acoustic guitar
John Hughey — steel guitar
Tommy Markham — drums and percussion
Bob Moore — bass

Covers and parodies
"Fifteen Years Ago"  was also recorded by other country music artists including:
Charley Pride on his 1971 album From Me to You
The Statler Brothers for their Bed of Rose's album in 1970.
In 1971, comedian Sheb Wooley, recording under his alias Ben Colder, recorded a parody of the song called "Fifteen Beers Ago."
John Prine and Lee Ann Womack recorded a duet version of Fifteen Years Ago for Prine's 2016 album, For Better, Or Worse.

Chart performance

References

1970 singles
1970 songs
Conway Twitty songs
The Statler Brothers songs
Charley Pride songs
John Prine songs
Lee Ann Womack songs
Decca Records singles
Song recordings produced by Owen Bradley